The Rock Island Arsenal comprises , located on Arsenal Island, originally known as Rock Island, on the Mississippi River between the cities of Davenport, Iowa, and Rock Island, Illinois. It lies within the state of Illinois.  Rock Island was previously used as the summer camp site for Sauk Native Americans, and the dispute over tribal ownership led to the Black Hawk War of 1832, after the primary leader of the Sauk, Black Hawk.  It is now home of First Army headquarters, and the US Army's Center of Excellence for Additive Manufacturing. 

The island was originally established as a government site in 1816, with the building of Fort Armstrong.  It is now the largest government-owned weapons manufacturing arsenal in the United States. It has manufactured military equipment and ordnance since the 1880s. In 1919–1920 one hundred of the Anglo-American or Liberty Mark VIII tanks were manufactured, although too late for World War I.  It is designated as a National Historic Landmark.

Established as both an arsenal and a center for the manufacture of leather accoutrements and field gear, today it provides manufacturing, logistics, and base support services for the Armed Forces. The Arsenal is the only active U.S. Army foundry, and manufactures ordnance and equipment, including artillery, gun mounts, recoil mechanisms, small arms, aircraft weapons sub-systems, grenade launchers, weapons simulators, and a host of associated components. Some of the Arsenal's most successful products include the M198 and M119 towed howitzers, and the M1A1 gun mount.  About 250 military personnel and 6,000 civilians work there. The 2000 census population was 145.

History

From the autobiography of Sauk Native American Black Hawk: "When we arrived we found that the troops had come to build a fort on Rock Island...We did not object, however, to their building their fort on the island, but were very sorry, as this was the best one on the Mississippi, and had long been the resort of our young people during the summer. It was our garden, like the white people have near their big villages, which supplied us with strawberries, blackberries, gooseberries, plums, apples and nuts of different kinds."

The island facilities were converted and built in 1863; they were not yet completed in December of that year, when the first Confederate prisoners were incarcerated. The construction was makeshift. The first prisoners were 468 Confederates captured in battles at Chattanooga, Tennessee. That month more than 5,000 Confederates would swell the population of Rock Island military prison. They were kept in 84 barracks, each holding around 100 prisoners. A total of 41 Confederate prisoners successfully escaped during the prison's operation, and many more would try but fail.

A total of 1,964 Confederate prisoners and 125 Union guards are buried in the adjacent military cemetery, including 49 members of the 108th Regiment of United States Colored Troops, who served as guards. Most died from disease, since sanitation was primitive as in all army encampments, and exposure to heat and humidity during the summers and freezing temperatures during winters. In 1864, deadly smallpox epidemics rapidly spread through the prison.

The prison camp operated from December 1863 until July 1865, when the last prisoners were freed. After the war, the prison facility was completely destroyed. During its two years in operation, the prison camp housed a total of more than 12,400 Confederates.

Other historical sites in the area include the Confederate Cemetery, the Rock Island National Cemetery, 19th-century stone workshops, officers' quarters along the river, Col. Davenport's House, and the site of the first bridge built across the Mississippi. Following the war, the federal government retained ownership of Arsenal Island and developed it for use as an arsenal and ordnance manufacturing center, which led to its being renamed.

Rock Island Arsenal Museum
The Rock Island Arsenal Museum was established on July 4, 1905. It is the second-oldest US Army Museum in the US after the West Point Museum.  The museum has been closed twice, during World War I and World War II, to provide more space for manufacturing facilities.   

Exhibits interpret the history of Rock Island Arsenal and the Union prison camp during the American Civil War, and the site's role as a military industrial facility.  The museum contains the second-largest collection of small arms weapons in the U.S. Army, and an outdoor vehicle display.

Indoor exhibits include (as of June 2012):

Outdoor exhibits include (as of June 2012):

See also
 Black Hawk
 American Civil War
 List of Civil War POW Prisons and Camps
 Prisoner-of-war camp
 List of National Historic Landmarks in Illinois

References

External links
 

The Rock Island Arsenal Joint Manufacturing & Technology Center (archive link)
The Rock Island Arsenal profile at globalsecurity.org
Rock Island Arsenal Museum
Rock Island Civil War prison (archive link)
Rock Island National Cemetery, Arsenal, and Confederate POW Camp
Rock Island Memorial POW Camp #2229
Rock Island Arsenal Wikimapia

1816 establishments in Illinois Territory
United States Army posts
Illinois in the American Civil War
American Civil War prison camps
Defunct prisons in Illinois
Islands of Illinois
Tourist attractions in Rock Island, Illinois
United States Army arsenals
National Historic Landmarks in Illinois
Military installations in Illinois
Economy of the Quad Cities
Tourist attractions in the Quad Cities
Quad Cities
Military and war museums in Illinois
Museums in Rock Island County, Illinois
National Register of Historic Places in Rock Island County, Illinois
Military facilities on the National Register of Historic Places in Illinois
Archaeological sites on the National Register of Historic Places in Illinois
Armories on the National Register of Historic Places in Illinois
Industrial buildings and structures on the National Register of Historic Places in Illinois
United States Army arsenals during World War II
Historic American Engineering Record in Illinois
Landforms of Rock Island County, Illinois
American Civil War on the National Register of Historic Places
Historic districts on the National Register of Historic Places in Illinois